The 1954 NFL season was the 35th regular season of the National Football League. The season ended when the Cleveland Browns defeated the Detroit Lions in the NFL Championship Game.

Draft
The 1954 NFL Draft was held on January 28, 1954 at Philadelphia's Bellevue-Stratford Hotel. With the first pick, the Cleveland Browns selected quarterback Bobby Garrett from Stanford University.

Major rule changes
Whenever it is raining, or whenever the field is wet and slippery, the offensive team can request a new, dry playable ball at any time.

Conference races
In the Western Division, the 49ers pulled ahead in Week Five (October 24) with a 37–31 win over the Lions, but they lost four of their remaining seven games and finished 7–4–1. 

The Lions, on the other hand, won six of their last seven, and finished 9–2–1. In the Eastern race, the Eagles got off to a 4–0 start, until dropping games to Pittsburgh (17–7) and Green Bay (37–14) to fall into a three-way tie with the Giants and Steelers. The Browns, who got off to a 1–2 start, went on an 8-game winning streak, gradually catching up with a Halloween win over New York (24–14).

A 6–0 win over Philadelphia on November 21 gave them the conference lead, and a 16–7 rematch win in New York the next week extended the margin.  

The Browns' streak was ended on December 19 with a 14–10 loss to the Lions, but when the teams met in Cleveland again the next week for the Championship, the Browns beat the Lions in a 56–10 rout.

Final standings

NFL Championship Game
Cleveland 56, Detroit 10 at Cleveland Stadium, Cleveland, Ohio, December 26, 1954

League leaders

Awards
Sporting News NFL Player of the Year – Lou Groza, Cleveland Browns
UPI NFL Most Valuable Player – Joe Perry, San Francisco 49ers

Coaching changes
Baltimore Colts: Keith Molesworth was replaced by Weeb Ewbank.
Green Bay Packers: Lisle Blackbourn became the Packers' new head coach. Gene Ronzani resigned after 10 games into 1953. Hugh Devore and Ray McLean served as co-head coaches for the rest of the 1953 season.
Pittsburgh Steelers: Joe Bach was replaced by Walt Kiesling.
New York Giants: Steve Owen was replaced by Jim Lee Howell.
Washington Redskins: Curly Lambeau was replaced by Joe Kuharich.

References
 NFL Record and Fact Book
 NFL History 1951–1960 (Last accessed December 4, 2005)
 Total Football: The Official Encyclopedia of the National Football League

National Football League seasons